The men's javelin throw event at the 2007 Pan American Games was held on July 28.

Results

References
Official results

Javelin
2007